Maria Bujakowa (12 May 1901 – 22 January 1985) was a Polish sculptor. Her work was part of the sculpture event in the art competition at the 1948 Summer Olympics.

References

1901 births
1985 deaths
20th-century Polish sculptors
20th-century Polish women artists
Polish women sculptors
Olympic competitors in art competitions
People from Kolomyia